Preparation may refer to:

 Preparation (dental), the method by which a tooth is prepared when removing decay and designing a form that will provide adequate retention for a dental restoration
 Preparation (music), treatment of dissonance in tonal music
 Preparation, Iowa, a ghost town
 Preparation time, time to prepare speeches in policy debate
 The Preparation, a 2017 South Korean film
 Preparations (album), a 2007 album by Prefuse 73
 Prepared dosage form
 Prepared drug
 Prepared food
 Prepared supplement
 Special modifications to instruments, see
Prepared piano
Prepared guitar
Fossil preparation

See also

 Preparation H, popular hemorrhoids medicine
 Preparation for the Gospel, early Christian book
 
 Prep (disambiguation)
 Preparationism
 Prepare (disambiguation)
 Preparedness (disambiguation)